Alabama Spirit is an American soccer team founded in 2007. The team is a member of the National Premier Soccer League (NPSL), the fourth tier of the American Soccer Pyramid, and will make their debut in the new Southeast Conference in 2008, playing a short season of "exhibition games" prior to a planned full inclusion into the league some time in the future.

The team will play their home games in a stadium in the city of Birmingham, Alabama. The venue is the Homewood Soccer Park.

Following the inaugural competition for the club (a 2–3 loss in a friendly against reserves from Mexico's CF Monterrey Rayados), the club owner said he hopes to have the Spirit in the higher-caliber United Soccer Leagues where he already owns the Nashville Metros.

References

National Premier Soccer League teams
Soccer clubs in Birmingham, Alabama
2007 establishments in Alabama
Association football clubs established in 2007